The construction of the Pirwadhai Mor Flyover and Underpass was started on October 23, 2012 and completed on March 16, 2013. The flyover was built at Peshawar Road where the traffic from Peshawar heads towards Saddar. While the underpass connects I.J. Principal Road with Peshawar Road, the flyover facilitates thousands of commuters coming in and going out of Rawalpindi and Islamabad and the residents of the densely populated localities of the twin cities daily. The length of the two-lane underpass is 436 m while the three-lane bridge is 380 m long and the length of ramps ranges from 95-96 m.

References

Bridges in Pakistan
Road interchanges in Pakistan